Khlong Thom is a neighbourhood in Bangkok, mainly in Pom Prap Sattru Phai District. It is located along Mahachak Road around its intersection with Charoen Krung, on the periphery of Bangkok's Chinatown in Samphanthawong District. Mahachak Road was built around 1930 on the site of the former Khlong Sampheng. The canal was filled in to make way for the road, hence the name Khlong Thom, which means "filled canal".

The Khlong Thom area is well known for shops and vendors selling a variety of goods, especially automotive hardware and electrical equipment. The vendors used to gather into a large market on Saturday nights, which encroached on public space and blocked traffic. In March 2015, the Bangkok Metropolitan Administration cracked down on the practice, shutting down the market and forcing the vendors to relocate.

References

Neighbourhoods of Bangkok
Pom Prap Sattru Phai district
Samphanthawong district